William Herrick (Trenton, NJ, January 10, 1915 – Old Chatham, NY, January 31, 2004) was an American novelist, sometimes referred to as "an American Orwell".

Biography
Herrick was born to Jewish parents who had come to the United States from Belarus and settled in Trenton, New Jersey. Herrick was among the Abraham Lincoln Brigade which fought Franco's forces during the Spanish Civil War. Drawing on that experience he wrote Hermanos! (1969), a novel about the war itself, and another novel set in Spain, Shadows and Wolves (1980), about the post-Franco period. He left the American Communist Party over the Hitler–Stalin non-aggression pact in 1939 and criticised the Brigade as willing accomplices of the Communist secret police, who were killing off anyone who criticized the Party.

Two other novels touch on his experience in Spain: Love and Terror (1981) and Kill Memory (1983). His autobiography is entitled Jumping the Line: The Adventures and Misadventures of an American Radical (1998).

Bibliography

Fiction

The Itinerant (1967)
Hermanos! (1969)
Strayhorn (1973)
Golcz: A Novel (1976)
Shadows and Wolves (1980)
Love and Terror (1981)
Kill Memory (1984)
That's Life: A Fiction (1985)
The Last to Die (1986)
Bradovich (1993)

Nonfiction

Jumping the Line: The Adventures and Misadventures of an American Radical (1998) - Autobiography

References

External links 
 Brief biography of William Herrick at the New York State Writers Institute website.

1915 births
2004 deaths
Writers from Trenton, New Jersey
American male novelists
American autobiographers
20th-century American novelists
American people of Belarusian-Jewish descent
Abraham Lincoln Brigade members
Novelists from New Jersey
20th-century American non-fiction writers
American male non-fiction writers
20th-century American male writers